The 1984–85 Coupe de France was the 68th Coupe de France, France's annual national football cup competition. It was won by AS Monaco who defeated Paris Saint-Germain in the final.

Round of 16

Quarter-finals

Semi-finals
First round

Second round

Final

References

French federation

1984–85 domestic association football cups
1984–85 in French football
1984-85